Uroš Mitrović (born 24 January 1984) is a Serbian handball player for Partizan.

Career
Mitrović started out at Partizan and played for five seasons with the club (2002–2007). He then spent five years abroad in Spain (Pilotes Posada) and France (Créteil), before returning to Partizan.

At international level, Mitrović represented Serbia at the 2013 World Men's Handball Championship and 2014 European Men's Handball Championship.

Honours
Partizan
 Handball League of Serbia and Montenegro: 2002–03
 Serbian Handball Cup: 2006–07, 2012–13
 Serbian Handball Super Cup: 2012

References

External links
 EHF record
 LNH record

1984 births
Living people
Handball players from Belgrade
Serbian male handball players
RK Partizan players
Expatriate handball players
Serbian expatriate sportspeople in Spain
Serbian expatriate sportspeople in France
Serbian expatriate sportspeople in Switzerland